Robbert Duval (21 September 1639, The Hague – 22 January 1732, The Hague), was a Dutch Golden Age painter who lived well into the 18th century.

Biography
According to the RKD he learned to paint from Nicolaes Willingh and became his assistant in Berlin in 1667. He left Berlin to make a trip to Rome in 1668, where he joined the Bentvueghels with the nickname Fortuyn.  He is known for painting portrait and historical allegories, of which none survive today.

According to Houbraken he left Rome for Padua in 1677 with Johannes Glauber and his brother. He probably left Padua with them for Venice, where he stayed until 1681. In 1682 he returned to the Hague, where he helped set up the Royal Academy of Art (The Hague) with Willem Doudijns, Theodor van der Schuer, and Daniel Mijtens the Younger. In the same year he became court painter to William III of England and worked at Het Loo Palace and Hampton Court. He lived to a great age.

References

1639 births
1732 deaths
Dutch Golden Age painters
18th-century Dutch painters
18th-century Dutch male artists
Dutch male painters
Members of the Bentvueghels
Painters from The Hague
Artists from The Hague
Court painters